Teresa Ruglio Sánchez (born January 4, 1996) is a Venezuelan-Maltese model and beauty pageant titleholder who was crowned Miss Universe Malta 2019. She represented Malta at Miss Universe 2019 competition but Unplaced.

Early life
Ruglio was born in Caracas to an Italo-Venezuelan family originally from Caposele, and holds triple Maltese, Italian and Venezuelan citizenship. Ruglio is the youngest of eleven children and her father Gelsomino died when she was 13.  The family left Venezuela and immigrated to Malta in 2016, due to the crisis in Venezuela and kidnapping and murder of her elder brother Bruno in Colombia. After arriving in Malta, the family settled in Sliema and Ruglio began studying English and Maltese .

Pageantry

Miss Universe Malta 2019
Ruglio represented the town of Sliema in the Miss Universe Malta 2019 competition held at the Hilton Malta in St. Julian's on 12 July 2019. She went on to win the competition and was crowned Miss Universe Malta at the end of the event by outgoing titleholder Francesca Mifsud. During the competition, Ruglio wished to raise awareness regarding the crisis in Venezuela, and to continue her work as a motivational speaker.  She plans to use her past tough experiences to help people to look at the world with a sense of optimism and create positive habits.

Miss Universe 2019
Ruglio represented Malta in the Miss Universe 2019 pageant. During the preliminary swimsuit competition, she slipped and nearly avoided falling on stage, along with several other contestants who also stumbled in the same spot. Ruglio ultimately went unplaced.

References

External links

1996 births
Living people
Maltese beauty pageant winners
Maltese people of Italian descent
Maltese people of Venezuelan descent
Miss Universe 2019 contestants
People from Caracas
People from Sliema
Venezuelan beauty pageant winners
Venezuelan emigrants to Malta
Venezuelan people of Italian descent